

Athletics

Alina Astafei
Iolanda Balaș
Violeta Beclea
Valeria Bufanu
Maria Cioncan
Anișoara Cușmir-Stanciu
Constantina Diţă
Paula Ivan
Lia Manoliu
Gheorghe Megelea
Doina Melinte
Argentina Menis
Marian Oprea
Oana Pantelimon
Mihaela Peneș
Maricica Puică
Ileana Silai
Lidia Șimon
Gabriela Szabo
Ionela Târlea
Viorica Viscopoleanu

Biathlon
Vilmoş Gheorghe
Éva Tófalvi

Bobsleigh
Dumitru Focşeneanu
Dumitru Hubert
Nicolae Neagoe
Ion Panţuru
Alexandru Papană

Boxing
Ion Alexe
Dumitru Cipere
Calistrat Cuțov
Simion Cuțov
Costică Dafinoiu
Mircea Dobrescu
Leonard Doroftei
Constantin Dumitrescu
Gheorghe Fiat
Ionuţ Gheorghe
Nicolae Linca
Ion Monea
Alec Năstac
Gheorghe Negrea
Valentin Silaghi
Dorel Simion
Marian Simion
Mircea Şimon
Vasile Tiță
Victor Zilberman

Canoeing

Gheorghe Andriev
Ion Bîrlădeanu
Antonel Borșan
Anton Calenic
Petre Capusta
Serghei Covaliov
Simion Cuciuc
Gheorghe Danielov
Vasile Dîba
Alexe Dumitru
Viorica Dumitru
Nicușor Eșanu
Ion Geantă
Marcel Glăvan
Andrei Igorov
Raluca Ioniță
Simion Ismailciuc
Dimitrie Ivanov
Haralambie Ivanov
Hilde Lauer
Mariana Limbău
Policarp Malîhin
Maria Nichiforov
Grigore Obreja
Ivan Patzaichin
Florin Popescu
Mitică Pricop
Elena Radu
Leon Rotman
Atanase Sciotnic
Larion Serghei
Cornelia Sideri
Gheorghe Simionov
Toma Simionov
Sanda Toma
Mihai Țurcaș
Roman Vartolomeu
Aurel Vernescu
Mihai Zafiu

Equestrian
Anghelache Donescu
Henri Rang
Petre Roşca
Dumitru Velicu

Fencing
Laura Badea-Cârlescu
Ana Maria Brânză
Mihai Covaliu
Ana Derșidan-Ene-Pascu
Tiberiu Dolniceanu
Ion Drîmbă
Rareș Dumitrescu
Ileana Gyulai-Drîmbă-Jenei
Dan Irimiciuc
Cornel Marin
Marin Mustață
Alexandru Nilca
Ioan Pop
Roxana Scarlat
Alexandru Sirițeanu
Ecaterina Stahl-Iencic
Reka Zsofia Lazăr-Szabo
Olga Orban-Szabo
Maria Vicol
Florin Zalomir

Football
Miodrag Belodedici
Gheorghe Hagi
Ciprian Marica
Viorel Moldovan
Dorinel Munteanu
Adrian Mutu
Constantin Pistol
Andrei Șeran

Gymnastics

Andreea Acatrinei
Simona Amânar
Oana Ban
Loredana Boboc
Cristina Bontaș
Diana Bulimar
Dan Burincă
Diana Chelaru
Nadia Comăneci
Mariana Constantin
Gabriela Drăgoi
Marian Drăgulescu
Rodica Dunca
Emilia Eberle
Alexandra Eremia
Georgeta Gabor
Gina Gogean
Dănuț Grecu
Anca Grigoraș
Andreea Grigore
Vanda Hădărean
Georgeta Hurmuzachi
Atanasia Ionescu
Larisa Iordache
Sonia Iovan
Andreea Isărescu
Sandra Izbașa
Elena Leuşteanu
Ionela Loaieș
Elena Mărgărit
Alexandra Marinescu
Lavinia Miloșovici
Maria Neculiţă
Steliana Nistor
Maria Olaru
Mirela Paşca
Cătălina Ponor
Ilie Daniel Popescu
Uta Poreceanu
Dan Nicolae Potra
Claudia Presăcan
Andreea Răducan
Monica Roșu
Melita Ruhn
Elena Săcălici
Răzvan Dorin Șelariu
Daniela Silivaș
Nicoleta Daniela Șofronie
Silvia Stroescu
Ioan Silviu Suciu
Anamaria Tămârjan
Gabriela Trușcă
Mirela Țugurlan
Dumitriţa Turner
Teodora Ungureanu
Marius Urzică
Emilia Vătăşoiu

Handball
Mircea Bedivan
Dumitru Berbece
Ștefan Birtalan
Iosif Boroș
Alexandru Buligan
Adrian Cosma
Gheorghe Covaciu
Marin Dan
Alexandru Dincă
Gheorghe Dogărescu
Cezar Drăgăniță
Marian Dumitru
Cornel Durău
Valentina Ardean-Elisei
Alexander Fölker
Mircea Grabovschi
Cristian Gațu
Gheorghe Gruia
Roland Gunesch
Claudiu Eugen Ionescu
Gabriel Kicsid
Ghiţă Licu
Nicolae Munteanu
Cristina Neagu
Vasile Oprea
Cornel Penu
Valentin Samungi
Simon Schobel
Adrian Simion
Vasile Stîngă
Werner Stöckl
Constantin Tudosie
Lucian Vasilache
Neculai Vasilcă
Radu Voina
Maricel Voinea

Ice Hockey
Elöd Antal
Istvan Antal
Dumitru Axinte
Ion Berdilă
Cazacu Cazan
Marian Costea
Şandor Gal
Ioan Gheorghiu
Alexandru Hălăucă
Gheorghe Huţan
Vasile Huțanu
Ion Ioniță
George Justinian
Tiberiu Mikloş
Vasile Morar
Doru Moroşan
Bela Nagy
Zoltán Nagy
Valerian Netedu
Constantin Nistor
Adrian Olenici
Eduard Pană
Marian Pisaru
Mihail Popescu
László Sólyom
Doru Tureanu
Dezideriu Varga
Nicolae Vişan

Judo
Corina Căprioriu
Alina Dumitru
Simona Richter

Luge
Ioan Apostol

Rowing
Felicia Afrăsiloaie
Angela Alupei
Angelica Aposteanu
Aurica Bărăscu
Enikő Barabás
Elena Bondar
Florica Bucur
Constanța Burcică
Petre Ceapura
Veronica Cochela
Maria Constantinescu
Georgeta Damian
Elena Dobrițoiu
Maria Magdalena Dumitrache
Rodica Frîntu
Liliana Gafencu
Elena Georgescu
Elena Giurcă
Olga Homeghi
Doina Ignat
Ana Iliuță
Elisabeta Lipă
Ladislau Lovrenschi
Camelia Macoviciuc-Mihalcea
Maria Micșa
Simona Muşat
Ioana Olteanu
Ioana Papuc
Dimitrie Popescu
Marioara Popescu
Valeria Răcilă
Dumitru Răducanu
Iulică Ruican
Rodica Şerban
Doina Spîrcu
Viorica Susanu
Nicolae Țaga
Viorel Talapan
Anca Tănase
Sanda Toma
Ioana Tudoran
Ştefan Tudor
Marlena Zagoni

Rugby union
Gheorghe Benţia
Teodor Florian
Nicolae Mărăscu
Mircea Sfetescu

Shooting
Ion Dumitrescu
Corneliu Ion
Daniel Iuga
Gheorghe Lichiardopol
Alin Moldoveanu
Ştefan Petrescu
Iulian Raicea
Marcel Roşca
Nicolae Rotaru
Iosif Sîrbu
Ion Tripşa

Speed skating
Mihaela Dascălu

Swimming
Beatrice Câșlaru
Răzvan Florea
Diana Mocanu
Camelia Potec
Timea Toth, Romanian-born Israeli Olympic swimmer

Tennis

Irina-Camelia Begu
Sorana Cîrstea
Simona Halep
Victor Hănescu
Ilie Năstase
Monica Niculescu
Raluca Olaru
Andrei Pavel
Magda Rurac
Virginia Ruzici
Mariana Simionescu
Irina Spîrlea
Horia Tecău
Ion Țiriac

Volleyball
Marius Căta-Chiţiga
Valter Chifu
Laurenţiu Dumănoiu
Günther Enescu
Dan Gîrleanu
Sorin Macavei
Viorel Manole
Florin Mina
Corneliu Oros
Nicolae Pop
Constantin Sterea
Nicu Stoian

Water polo
Cosmin Radu
Bogdan Rath

Weightlifting
Roxana Cocoș
Răzvan Martin
Nicu Vlad

Wrestling
Constantin Alexandru
Vasile Andrei
Ion Baciu
Gheorghe Berceanu
Valeriu Bularca
Ion Cernea
Roman Codreanu
Petre Dicu
Victor Dolipschi
Nicu Gingă
Francisc Horvat
Vasile Iorga
Nicolae Martinescu
Stelică Morcov
Dumitru Pârvulescu
Simion Popescu
Ștefan Rusu
Ladislau Şimon
Ion Țăranu

See also
Sport in Romania
Romania at the Olympics

Sportspeople
Romania